Szilágy may refer to: 

 Szilágy County, a historic administrative county. 
 Szilágy (village), village in Hungary. 
 Szilágy (newspaper)